Wit's End is the fifth full-length album by Cass McCombs.  It was released on Domino Records in April 2011, becoming the first of two albums released by McCombs that year. The first single from the album, "County Line", was accompanied by two different music videos.

Track listing
All songs written and composed by Cass McCombs.

Personnel

Musicians
 Cass McCombs – vocals, acoustic guitar, synthesizer, piano, electric piano, percussion
 Will Canzoneri – Hammond B3, clavinet, celeste
 Chris Cohen – electric guitar, 12-string acoustic guitar
 Walker Teret – upright bass, vocals, banjo
 Orpheo McCord – drums, percussion
 Garrett Ray – drums, percussion
 Rob Barbato – bass, vocals
 Robbie Lee – bass clarinet, accordion, chalumeau, portatif organ
 Justin Meldal-Johnsen – bass
 Parker Kindred – drums, percussion
 Brad Truax – bass
 Peter Moren – miniature acoustic guitar

Production
 Cass McCombs – production, additional engineering
 Ariel Rechtshaid – production, engineering
 Dave Schiffman – engineering, mixing
 Chris Coady – additional engineering
 Eric Spring – additional engineering
 Bernie Grundman – mastering
 Albert Herter – drawings
 Malcolm Pullinger – cover design
 Philippe Remond – cover photograph

References

External links
Cass McCombs (official site)
Domino Records album release details

2011 albums
Domino Recording Company albums
Albums produced by Ariel Rechtshaid
Cass McCombs albums